Jarjouh is a village in Lebanon, located in the Nabatieh District, Nabatieh Governorate.
between the villages of Houmin Al Fawqa, Arabsalim, Jbaa, Ain Bouswar, Alwayizeh, Soujod, Ain Qana. The village sits on the shoulder of Mleeta hills, with Oak forests on the surrounding mountains. Al Zahrani River spring starts in Jarjouh known as Al Taseh spring. The demography of Jarjouh is approx. 50% Christian and 50% Muslim.

History 
Some scholars attribute the origin of this town's name to the Hebrew word meaning “the shaved, the hairless or the bald.” Others trace it back to a combination of two root words meaning “drinking and shortage.”

The town has some grottos at a place called “Al-Chir” and also features waterways relating to Zenobia, ancient queen of Tadmor.

On 8 July 1990 Jarjouh and four other locations were attached by the Israeli airforce. It was the twelfth Israeli air attack on Lebanon since the beginning of the year. Five people were reported killed.

A week later, 16 July, Jarjouh was captured from Amal by Hizbullah. It was the culmination of two weeks of fighting in which around two hundred people were killed.

On 4 May 1995 a villager was killed by Israeli shellfire.

References

External links
 Jarjouaa, Localiban

Populated places in Nabatieh District